Helmut Brandstätter (born 24 April 1955 in Vienna) is an Austrian journalist, author and politician (NEOS).

Early life and education 
Helmut Brandstätter studied law at the University of Vienna, where he was also chairman of the student body there and was awarded a doctorate in 1978.

Career 
In 1982 Brandstätter started his career at broadcaster, with whom he stayed until 1997. 

In 1997 Brandstätter went to Berlin as managing director and editor-in-chief of the news channel n-tv. In 2003 he returned to Austria as managing director and presenter of the newly founded broadcaster Puls 4. From 2005 he worked as a freelance management consultant and moderator. From 2010 to 2018 he was editor-in-chief of the daily newspaper Kurier and from 2013 to 2019 also its publisher. 

Brandstätter ran for NEOS for the National Council election in Austria 2019, and has been a member of the National Council since October 2019.

Other activities
 National Fund of the Republic of Austria for Victims of National Socialism, Member of the Board of Trustees

Publications (selection) 
 2008: Hör. Mir. Zu. Drei Schritte ins Jahrtausend der Kommunikation, ecowin Verlag, Salzburg 2008, .
 2014: So kann Europa gelingen: Gespräche mit Werner Faymann, Sigmar Gabriel, Federica Mogherini, together with Margaretha Kopeinig, Kremayr & Scheriau, Wien 2014, .
 2019: Brandstätter vs. Brandstetter: Diskurs, together with Wolfgang Brandstetter, Kremayr & Scheriau, Wien 2019, .
 2019: Kurz & Kickl: Ihr Spiel mit Macht und Angst, Kremayr & Scheriau, Wien 2019, .
 2020: Letzter Weckruf für Europa, Kremayr & Scheriau, Wien 2020, .

References

Sources 

 
 Helmut Brandstätter at www.meineabgeordneten.at

1955 births
Living people
21st-century Austrian politicians
Austrian editors
Austrian television presenters
Journalists from Vienna
Mass media people from Vienna
Members of the National Council (Austria) 
NEOS – The New Austria politicians 
Print journalists 
University of Vienna alumni
Kurier editors